The Grand Prix de la ville d'Angoulême is a lifetime achievement award given annually during the Angoulême International Comics Festival to a comics author. Although not a monetary award, it is considered the most prestigious award in Franco-Belgian comics.

It has been awarded mainly to French and Belgian authors, but also to international authors. Recipients are, on average, 50 years old. Three women, Florence Cestac, Rumiko Takahashi, and Julie Doucet have been awarded the prize.

History
The prize was first awarded during the first Angoulême festival in 1974. Traditionally, the winner has been selected as the president of the board and the prize jury of next year's festival. Since 1982, the winners have also drawn the next year's festival poster. In 1984, cartoonist Claire Bretécher received a special tenth anniversary award apart from the main prize, a practice since repeated on subsequent anniversaries.

After 1989, the prize was awarded by a jury of all previous winners, except for the time from 1997 to 1999 when all creators attending the festival voted on the winner. The jury system was criticized for favoring cronyism and Franco-centrism, and was abandoned after 2012. Subsequent years have seen a variety of changing award mechanisms. In 2015, the winner was again selected by vote of all registered comics creators, based on a list of nominees.

In January 2016, 12 of the 30 nominees for the 2016 prize withdrew their names from consideration in protest against a shortlist of exclusively male nominees.  Following media reports, the festival's board first announced 6 additional female nominees,
 then retracted all nominees, allowing registered professionals to vote for any person.

Winners

1970s
1974 André Franquin (Gaston, Marsupilami, Spirou et Fantasio)
1975 Will Eisner (A Contract with God, The Dreamer, To the Heart of the Storm)
1976 René Pellos (René Pellarin) (sports cartoonist)
1977 Jijé (Joseph Gillain) (Spirou et Fantasio, Jerry Spring, Tanguy et Laverdure)
1978 Jean-Marc Reiser (cartoonist)
1979 Marijac (Jacques Dumas) (youth comics)

1980s

1980 Fred (Othon Aristides)
1981 Moebius / Jean Giraud
1982 Paul Gillon
1983 Jean-Claude Forest
10th anniversary Claire Bretécher
1984 Jean-Claude Mézières (Valérian and Laureline)
1985 Jacques Tardi
1986 Jacques Lob
1987 Enki Bilal
1988 Philippe Druillet
15th anniversary Hugo Pratt
1989 René Pétillon

1990s

1990 
1991 Gotlib (Marcel Gotlieb)
1992 Frank Margerin
20th anniversary Morris (Maurice de Bevere)
1993 Gérard Lauzier
1994 Nikita Mandryka
1995 Philippe Vuillemin
1996 André Juillard
1997 Daniel Goossens
1998 François Boucq
1999 Robert Crumb
Special prize of the millennium Albert Uderzo

2000s

2000 Florence Cestac
2001 Martin Veyron
2002 François Schuiten
2003 Régis Loisel
2004 Zep (Philippe Chappuis)
30th anniversary Joann Sfar
2005 Georges Wolinski
2006 Lewis Trondheim
2007 José Antonio Muñoz
2008 Dupuy and Berberian
2009 Blutch

2010s
2010: Baru
2011: Art Spiegelman
2012: 
2013: Bernard Willem Holtrop (Willem)
40th anniversary Akira Toriyama
2014: Bill Watterson
2015: Katsuhiro Otomo
2016: Hermann Huppen
2017:  (Bernard Cosendai)
2018: Richard Corben
2019: Rumiko Takahashi

2020s
2020 : 
2021: Chris Ware
2022: Julie Doucet
2023: Riad Sattouf

References

External links 
 

Comics awards